Club Penguin Island was a massively-multiplayer online role-playing game (MMORPG) and was considered a successor to Club Penguin. The game was released worldwide on March 29, 2017 and was created by Disney Canada Inc. in order to keep the Club Penguin franchise alive as closing its predecessor, Club Penguin, was necessary.

The game's public beta testing period took place in Australia and New Zealand from December 15, 2016 to its worldwide release, and in Canada from January 13, 2017 to its worldwide release. The game was discontinued on December 20, 2018. The gameplay is similar to that of the original Club Penguin, though it runs on the game engine Unity rather than Adobe Flash Player.

Club Penguin Island received mixed reviews from critics and many negative reviews from some of the original game's old players upon its worldwide release for lacking many features of the original version at launch. The 1.8 updates, released on November 30, 2017, received positive reviews for adding fan-requested features and launching a PC and Mac version of the game.

On September 27, 2018, Disney confirmed the imminent discontinuation of Club Penguin Island in a letter obtained by the website Kotaku, as well as in an official blog post. It was removed from Google Play and the App Store on November 20, 2018. Downloading for desktop was also removed on December 20, 2018.

On November 5, 2018, the final update, version 1.13.0, was released, which included an offline mode, effectively making the game still available as a single-player experience. At 10:00 AM PST on December 20, 2018, Club Penguin Island had shut down their servers. All users that were playing Club Penguin Island at the time received an error message telling them that the connection was lost. Offline Mode was activated on December 21, 2018. Most of Club Penguin Islands URLs redirect to the official Disney website.

History 

The game was originally known under the code name of Project: Super Secret, first used in 2014 and teased with sneak peeks in June 2015. However, Project: Super Secret was initially said to be Disney Mix, with the game's actual development confirmed to have started in 2015. On November 17, 2016, the project was revealed to be Club Penguin Island. The official website for the game was released and pre-registration began allowing players to pre-register their account for the game. By pre-registering, players would receive a Beta Hat, a set of six emojis, and 100 coins. Additionally, players had the option of connecting their Club Penguin accounts with their Club Penguin Island account. If this was done, they would also receive the Alumni Jacket, with a number on the back displaying how many years the connected Club Penguin account has existed. The pre-registration was ended on March 29, 2017.

The game's closed beta took place between its announcement and December 2016 in North America.

A semi-private "geo-beta" took place in Australia and New Zealand between December 15, 2016 to its worldwide release. This beta was extended to iOS users in Canada on January 13, 2017.

The original Flash game's servers went offline on the day of the game's release on March 30, 2017 at 12:01:39 AM PDT (7:01:39 AM UTC).

On November 13, 2017, it was announced in a live stream on the official Facebook page of the game that a desktop version of Club Penguin Island would be released the same day the 1.8 update releases at.

On November 30, 2017, the desktop version was launched as an open beta, allowing players to report bugs in preparation for a full release at a later date.

On September 27, 2018, Disney confirmed in a letter to Disney Canada, obtained by the website Kotaku, that Club Penguin Island would be shutting down. Disney HR cited "global competition" as a factor in their decision.

In addition to the shutdown, the entire Club Penguin team, based out of Kelowna, British Columbia, was laid off, despite being greenlit for two more years of work only three weeks prior to the announcement of the shutdown.

On October 12, 2018, the shutdown date was confirmed to be December 20, 2018. Two last parties were also announced, being the Halloween Party 2018 and Waddle On Party.

The Mobile App was removed from the Google Play Store and App Store on November 20, 2018, one month prior to the server shutdown.

The game was shut down on December 20, 2018 and is no longer available to play online.

Offline mode was launched on December 21, allowing the player's account/penguin to be saved after the shutdown.

Plot and gameplay 

Club Penguin Island is divided into various zones and distinct areas and contains a variety of features. Each player has a penguin level that is a measurement of their progress. Progress increases as the player completes Adventures and Daily Challenges. Every time a player reaches a new level, they receive a reward in the form of a pack, containing various items, such as emojis or blueprints. All rewards apart from emojis in these packs require membership to use.

Clothing customization 

The Clothing Customizer, referred to as The Designer in loading screens, is a feature in Club Penguin Island that players can use to create clothing, utilizing blueprints as bases, and optionally, fabrics and/or decals as well for design. All players can use the Customizer, although only members can wear the resulting clothing. Members have the ability to sell their clothing and buy clothing submitted by other players. Each day, there is a different type of catalog, with a theme. The theme of the catalog determines which blueprints, fabrics, and decals can be used. The theme resets at midnight in Penguin Standard Time. (PST)

Adventures 

Adventures, also known as quests, and prefixed with ep. (short for episode) are activities in Club Penguin Island that players may partake in, and are received by talking to specific quest characters. Adventures involve players traveling around the island, completing tasks, and solving problems. Completing adventures yields coins and XP, and often various other rewards as well, such as a unique item or blueprints. Members are able to take part in every adventure. However, non-members are limited to taking part in one adventure from each character.

Daily Challenges 

Daily Challenges are activities in Club Penguin Island that players may partake in daily. Each challenge requires players to perform certain actions in order to complete, and each yields a reward in coins and XP, although some community challenges do not yield XP. There are a set of four challenges per day, and these challenges change every midnight in PST but are always in the same set of four. They can be accessed through the Island Live Phone, which displays a tab of the day's challenges. Completing challenges is one of the ways players can gain levels.

Collectibles 

Scattered throughout the island are collectible items that can be exchanged for coins at the Beacon Boardwalk. Each collectible has a certain coin exchange rate, location where they are available, amount available per area, and respawn time after collecting.

Igloos 

Each player is provided with an igloo for a home which both members and non-members are able to customize.  Members have the ability to choose from many variants of igloos as well as purchase items from a full catalog of furniture, landscaping, terrain, interactives, and more. Non-members are able to purchase two types of igloos and non-member items from the catalog. Items can be bought with virtual coins that are earned by playing mini-games, collecting coins throughout the zones, and trading in collectibles at the exchange. Like its predecessor, Club Penguin, anyone can access a players igloo on Club Penguin Island by clicking the igloo icon on their profile, provided the player has selected to make their igloo public.

Gear 

Gear is a type of item that members can use to perform various actions. Gear that is obtained through leveling-up or adventures is portable and can be used anywhere on the island. There is also gear that can be found in certain locations and can be used even if the player has yet to obtain it. Non-members can only use the jackhammer gear.

Events 

Several events were held on Club Penguin Island. In most cases, one or more free items were made available for everyone to obtain. Some events came with quests that all players were able to participate in. One example of this was the Halloween party. Like its predecessor, the game also hosted some sponsored events.

Party Supplies 

Party Supplies are consumable items that can be bought at shops by members, and can be used, each with varying effects. Party Supplies include items such as fireworks, edible items, and party games.

Games 

Club Penguin Island contains a variety of games, eight of which are available for all players. Most of these games reward the players with coins and XP upon completion. Both members and non-members are able to purchase and use the party games Marble Hunt, Ink or Swim, and Fossil Four. There are also games that are built-in to the Club Penguin Island zones. Team Dance Battle is a multiplayer memorization game that everyone is able to play with the maximum limit of players in each round being a total of twenty, and at the minimum, one player in each team. Tube racing is a multiplayer racing game that is played by everyone on the top of Mt. Blizzard every couple of minutes. Other games for everyone include the Sea Caves Race Course, the Crate Co. Target Game and Tilt-o-Tube, which involves players trying to knock their opponents off a floating platform.

Island Live 

Island Live is a feature added in the 1.8 update of the game. It's the successor of the CPI Phone that was added in the 1.2 update. It can be accessed by clicking on a Phone icon. It shows information about live events taking place on Club Penguin Island, displays Daily Challenges and contains a variety of apps, like a Friends menu, Island News, and Settings.

Membership 

Club Penguin Island's revenue was raised predominantly through paid subscriptions, cheaper than its predecessor, of a one-week, one-month, three-month, six-month or twelve-month paid membership, although free access of the game is available. Membership allows players' access to a range of additional features. This includes designing all clothing, wearing all clothing, buying Party Supplies, playing all adventures, completing all Daily Challenges, the ability to use all gear and more. Penguins with a paid membership are called "members", whereas players who do not have a membership are referred to as "non-members".

Although members gain additional features, players without a membership can obtain all event items whether they're a member or not, obtain wearable event shirts, customize certain items in the Clothing Customizer, play the first adventure of every quest giving character, use Party Supplies given to them by members, customize an igloo (of which anyone is able to visit) with any quantity from a selection of non-member igloo items, play all mini-games, use the jackhammer gear, buy and play party games, join tube races, waddle around anywhere on the island, chat with other players, reach the maximum Penguin Level, and take part in non-member Daily Challenges. After the 1.10.1 update, non-members who signed up during the pre-registration period are now able to wear the beta hat, and if they connected their Club Penguin usernames for use in Club Penguin Island, their alumni jacket too.

All players automatically received a free, unlimited membership on November 5, 2018, which would carry over to Offline Mode. Refunds were processed for memberships extending beyond November 6, 2018.

Offline Mode 
Offline Mode was added to Club Penguin Island in the game's final update, and it was activated on December 21, 2018. It allowed players to log in to a limited version of the game, which stored their penguins on their devices. Players were unable to see or interact with any other penguins in the game.

A new feature called Debug Mode was also added, which is a tool that Club Penguin Island's developers used to test the game. It allows players to teleport to different locations in the game, add a custom number of coins to their account, and import/export their player data – among other tweaks. The network menu allows players to create their own private server using SmartFoxServer (similarly to private servers from the original Club Penguin), however there is no documentation on how to do so. A content submenu also appeared on March 28, 2019, which allows players to customize the game.

Accolades 
The game was nominated for "Best Music in a Casual/Social Game" at the 16th Annual Game Audio Network Guild Awards.

Notes

References

External links 
 Official website

Club Penguin
2017 video games
Android (operating system) games
Massively multiplayer online role-playing games
Disney video games
IOS games
Mobile games
Video games about birds
Video games developed in Canada
Video games set on fictional islands
Products and services discontinued in 2018
Internet properties disestablished in 2018
Inactive massively multiplayer online games